Columbus Township, Michigan may be one of the following places:

 Columbus Township, Luce County, Michigan
 Columbus Township, St. Clair County, Michigan

See also 
 Columbus Township (disambiguation)

Michigan township disambiguation pages